P. V. Shajikumar is a Malayalam author, screenplay writer and software engineer. He has won Kendra Sahitya Akademi's Yuva Award and Kerala Sahitya Akademi's Geeta Hiranyan Award.

Biography

He married Maneesha Narayan. He ventured into writing during his college day and published his first short story collection ‘Janam’ at the age of 23. He wrote the screenplay for Kanyaka Talkies, based on his short story 18+, along with Ranjini Krishnan and K. R. Manoj  The movie was screened at numerous film festivals and won award for the Best Screenplay at 14th Annual New York Indian Film Festival and the International Critics Prize (FIPRESCI Prize) for Best Malayalam Film at the 18th International Film Festival of Kerala. Forbes India magazine selected it as one among the five must watch Indian movies in 2014.

Screenwriter

Bibliography

Janam - Short story collection. DC Books, 2006. 
Vellarippaadam – Short story collection. DC Books, 2009. 
Kalichampothiyilekku Oru Half Ticket - Articles. Poorna Publications, 2011. 
Kidapparasamaram – Short story collection. Mathrubhumi Books, 2012. 
Ullal – Short story collection. DC Books, 2014. 
 Itha Innumuthal Itha Innalevare - Memoirs. DC Books, 2017.

Awards and achievements

2015 : Anganam Award
2014 : 14th Annual New York Indian Film Festival Award for the Best Screenplay
2014 : C. V. Raman Smrithi Award - Kidapparasamaram
2013 : Kendra Sahitya Akademi's Yuva Award – Vellarippaadam
2012 : Vishwamalayala Mahotsavam Award
2009 : Kerala Sahitya Akademi's Geeta Hiranyan Award - Janam
2009 : Anganam-E.P. Sushama Endowment Award

References 

Screenwriters from Kerala
Indian male short story writers
Malayalam-language writers
People from Kasaragod district
Living people
Recipients of the Kerala Sahitya Akademi Award
Recipients of the Sahitya Akademi Award in Malayalam
1983 births
21st-century Indian short story writers
21st-century Indian male writers
21st-century Indian screenwriters
Recipients of the Sahitya Akademi Yuva Puraskar